Cromwell is a city in Union County, Iowa, United States.  The population was 105 at the 2020 census.

Geography

Demographics

2010 census
As of the census of 2010, there were 107 people, 42 households, and 29 families residing in the city. The racial makeup of the city was 100.0% White.

There were 42 households, of which 35.7% had children under the age of 18 living with them, 59.5% were married couples living together, 2.4% had a female householder with no husband present, 7.1% had a male householder with no wife present, and 31.0% were non-families. 23.8% of all households were made up of individuals, and 9.5% had someone living alone who was 65 years of age or older. The average household size was 2.55 and the average family size was 2.97.

The median age in the city was 39.1 years. 22.4% of residents were under the age of 18; 11.1% were between the ages of 18 and 24; 27.1% were from 25 to 44; 26.2% were from 45 to 64; and 13.1% were 65 years of age or older. The gender makeup of the city was 55.1% male and 44.9% female.

2000 census
As of the census of 2000, there were 120 people, 47 households, and 31 families residing in the city. The racial makeup of the city was 99.17% White, and 0.83% from two or more races. Hispanic or Latino of any race were 0.83% of the population.

There were 47 households, out of which 31.9% had children under the age of 18 living with them, 59.6% were married couples living together, 2.1% had a female householder with no husband present, and 34.0% were non-families. 34.0% of all households were made up of individuals, and 8.5% had someone living alone who was 65 years of age or older. The average household size was 2.55 and the average family size was 3.32.

In the city, the population was spread out, with 30.0% under the age of 18, 5.8% from 18 to 24, 26.7% from 25 to 44, 30.0% from 45 to 64, and 7.5% who were 65 years of age or older. The median age was 37 years. For every 100 females, there were 106.9 males. For every 100 females age 18 and over, there were 100.0 males.

The median income for a household in the city was $35,000, and the median income for a family was $36,750. Males had a median income of $24,375 versus $26,250 for females. The per capita income for the city was $12,190. There were 27.0% of families and 42.9% of the population living below the poverty line, including 56.8% of under eighteens and 23.8% of those over 64.

References

Cities in Iowa
Cities in Union County, Iowa